A carcass grade is an assessment of quality for a culled cow or bull. The various grades are defined by the United States Department of Agriculture, and assessments are based primarily on the fatness of the cow to be culled.

Cows are culled from herds for a variety of reasons, including poor production, age, or health problems. A carcass grade (or expected carcass grade) is used to determine selling prices for cull cows, which are estimated to comprise 20% of the beef available to consumers in the United States.

Grades are determined based on an animal's fat content and body condition. The most common grades, from best to worst, are "breakers" (fleshy, body condition 7 or above), "boners" (body condition 5 to 7), "lean", and "light" (thin, body condition 1 to 4). Carcasses rated as lean or light often are sold for less per pound, as less meat is produced from the carcass despite processing costs remaining similar to those of higher grade carcasses.

See also
USDA beef grades

References

Beef